Aponogeton boivinianus is a species of flowering plant in the Aponogetonaceae family. It is Native to Madagascar

Description
From a round, flattened tuber, arise a rosette of broad, elongated leaves on short stems. The leaves have an attractive indented surface and are a dark, rather transparent green in colour. It reaches a height of about 24 inches (60 cm).

Cultivation and uses
Cultivated as an aquarium plant where it seems to prefer rather cooler water than the other species from this region. Prefers very clean water and a good substrate to grow in.

Propagation is from seeds.

References

External links
 Krib article

biovinianus
Endemic flora of Madagascar
Freshwater plants
Taxa named by Henri Ernest Baillon
Taxa named by Henri Lucien Jumelle